Valencia Club de Fútbol Mestalla, shortened to Valencia Mestalla, is the reserve team of Valencia CF, a Spanish football club based in Valencia, in the namesake community. Founded in 1944, and currently plays in Segunda Federación – Group 3, holding home games at Ciudad Deportiva de Paterna, with a 4,000-seat capacity.

Unlike in England, reserve teams in Spain play in the same football pyramid as their senior team rather than a separate league. However, reserve teams cannot play in the same division as their senior team. Therefore, the team is ineligible for promotion to La Liga, the division in which the main side plays. Reserve teams are also no longer permitted to enter the Copa del Rey.

History
Founded in 1944 as Club Deportivo Mestalla, the club spent 21 seasons in the Segunda División in the period between 1947 and 1973, including a best ever finish of second place in the southern section in 1951–52; they went on to finish top of the promotion play-off group, but were ineligible for promotion to La Liga as the reserve team of Valencia CF, who were already playing in that division.

In 1972–73, the club finished bottom of the Segunda División and was relegated to the Tercera División; three years later, they were relegated again to the Valencian  Regional Preferente, the top division of regional football in Spain. However, their stay was shortlived as a reorganisation of the Spanish league saw them reinstated to the Tercera División, now the fourth tier of the national football pyramid. They were briefly promoted back to the Segunda División B for the 1987–88 season, but were relegated again after finishing just one point from safety. In 1991, after three more seasons in the Tercera División, they merged fully with Valencia CF, officially becoming the club's B team.

In their first season as Valencia B, they finished top of their Tercera División and were promoted back to the Segunda División B. Since then, they have played all but five seasons in the Segunda División B, reaching a peak of second place in their group in 2001–02.

Season-by-season
As CD Mestalla

Merged with Valencia

21 seasons in Segunda División
25 seasons in Segunda División B
1 season in Segunda Federación
28 seasons in Tercera División
1 season in Tercera División RFEF

Players

Current squad
.

From Youth Academy

Out on loan

References

External links

Futbolme team profile 
La Futbolteca team profile 
Fútbol regional team profile 

Valencia CF
Spanish reserve football teams
Football clubs in Valencia
Association football clubs established in 1944
1944 establishments in Spain
Premier League International Cup
Segunda División clubs